The 1958 Wyoming Cowboys football team was an American football team that represented the University of Wyoming as a member of the Skyline Conference during the 1958 NCAA University Division football season. In their second year under head coach Bob Devaney, the Cowboys compiled an 8–3 record (6–1 against Skyline opponents), won the Sun Bowl over Hardin–Simmons, and outscored opponents by a total of 205 to 136. They played their home games at War Memorial Stadium in Laramie, Wyoming.

The team was led on the field by quarterbacks Jerry Wilkinson and Jim Walden.

Utah was defeated in Laramie on November 1; it was Wyoming's last home game in the month of November for over two decades, until 1979.

Schedule

1958 team players in the NFL
The following were selected in the 1959 NFL Draft.

References

External links
Sports Reference – 1958 Wyoming Cowboys football

Wyoming
Wyoming Cowboys football seasons
Mountain States Conference football champion seasons
Sun Bowl champion seasons
Wyoming Cowboys